Sign of the Winner is the second full-length album by the French power metal band Heavenly. It was released on 24 September 2001 by Noise Records.

Track listing

Personnel 
Benjamin Sotto - Vocals
Frédéric Leclercq - Guitar
Pierre-Emmanuel Pelisson - Bass
Maxence Pilo - Drums

Additional musicians 
Alex Beyrodt - co-lead guitar on "Condemned To Die" and "The Sandman"

2001 albums
Heavenly (French band) albums
Noise Records albums